Shadyside High School is a public high school in Shadyside, Ohio, United States. It is the only high school in the Shadyside Local School District. Athletic teams compete as the Shadyside Tigers in the Ohio High School Athletic Association as a member of the Ohio Valley Athletic Conference.

OHSAA State Championships

 Boys Track and Field – 1976
 Girls Softball - 2015

References

External links
 District Website

High schools in Belmont County, Ohio
Public high schools in Ohio
Public middle schools in Ohio